Two ships of the United States Navy have borne the name USS Oak Hill, in honor of Oak Hill plantation, the estate of James Monroe, the fifth U.S. President, in Loudoun County, Virginia.

United States Navy ship names